The Bradford Area School District is a mid-sized, rural and suburban public school district in north central Pennsylvania, in the United States.

It serves the City of Bradford, Borough of Lewis Run and Bradford Township, Corydon Township, Foster Township and Lafayette Township in McKean County, Pennsylvania.

Schools 
The district operates four buildings:

Elementary schools (K-5)

Middle school (6-8) 
Floyd C. Fretz Middle School
140 Lorana Av., Bradford, PA 16701

High school (9-12) 
Bradford Area High School
81 Interstate Parkway, Bradford, PA 16701

Extracurriculars
The district offers a variety of clubs, activities and sports.

Athletics
The district offers:

Fall sports:
 Boys Golf
 Boys Soccer
 Cross Country
 Football - Varsity, Junior Varsity and Freshmen
 Girls Golf
 Girls Soccer
 Girls Tennis
 Girls Volleyball

Winter sports:
 Boys Basketball - Varsity and Freshmen
 Girls Basketball - Varsity and Freshmen
 Swimming      
 Wrestling

Spring sports:
 Baseball
 Softball
 Boys Tennis
 Track

References

School districts in McKean County, Pennsylvania